Vices is the third full-length album by Christian hard rock band Dead Poetic. The album was released on October 31, 2006 through Tooth & Nail Records. Aaron Sprinkle once again produced the album, and Chino Moreno of Deftones contributed guest vocals to "Paralytic." Lead vocalist Brandon Rike left the band shortly before the album's release and the band's remaining members opted not to continue with the band, although recently it has been stated that the band has not broken up, and will continue writing music.

The album is a departure from Dead Poetic's earlier work in many ways. First, only Rike and guitarist Zach Miles remained from the band's lineup on its 2004 breakthrough, New Medicines. Second, Rike does not scream on the record, thus abandoning the band's earlier post-hardcore sound in favor of straight-up rock & roll. Finally, as a result of this shift in styles, Vices is released solely through Tooth & Nail, not through Tooth & Nail's heavier subsidiary Solid State Records, which released the band's first two albums.

Vices peaked at #7 on the Billboard Heatseekers Chart.

Track listing

Credit
Brandon Rike—vocals
Zach Miles— lead guitar 
Dusty Redmon— rhythm guitar 
John Brehm—bass
Jesse Sprinkle—drums
Chino Moreno—guest vocals on "Paralytic"; co-producer of "Paralytic" and "Crashing Down"
Phil Peterson—strings on "Vices"
Chad Johnson—A&R
Produced by Aaron Sprinkle
Mixed by Josh Wilbur
Mastered by Howie Weinberg
Art Design by Ryan Clark

References

Vices (album)
Vices (album)
Dead Poetic albums
Albums produced by Aaron Sprinkle